Mauro Calligaris (6 May 1952 – 8 August 2000) was an Italian swimmer, who competed in the 400 m individual medley event at the 1972 Summer Olympics. His younger sister Novella was also an Olympic swimmer.

After retiring from competitions Calligaris worked as a swimming coach. He died in a traffic incident aged 48.

Calligaris was athlete of the Gruppo Sportivo Fiamme Oro.

References

1952 births
2000 deaths
Olympic swimmers of Italy
Swimmers at the 1972 Summer Olympics
Male medley swimmers
Swimmers of Fiamme Oro
Road incident deaths in Italy